Monsters is the fourth and final album by D'espairsRay, released on July 27, 2010, available for physical distribution and digital distribution on iTunes. The previously released singles, "Final Call" and "Love Is Dead", were included in the track listing. D'espairsRay started their Human Clad-Monsters World Tour soon after the albums' release.

Track listing

Disc Two (DVD, Limited Edition Only)
 Death Point PV - 3:25
 The Making Of "Death Point"

Personnel
Hizumi – vocals
Karyu – guitar, backing vocal
Zero - bass guitar
Tsukasa – drums, programming

References

2007 albums
D'espairsRay albums